Stewarts Lane was the name of two separate railway stations.

The first station, opened by the West End of London and Crystal Palace Railway, was originally located between what is now  and Pimlico. It was opened on 29 May 1858 and closed on 1 December 1858.

This station was opened on 1 May 1863 and closed on 1 January 1867. It was located south of the previous station.

References

Disused railway stations in the London Borough of Wandsworth
Railway stations in Great Britain opened in 1858
Railway stations in Great Britain closed in 1858
Railway stations in Great Britain opened in 1863
Railway stations in Great Britain closed in 1867
Former London, Chatham and Dover Railway stations